Many notable bands originally went by different names before their mainstream breakthrough. This list of original names of bands list only former official band names that are significantly different from the eventual "famous" name. This list does not include former band names that have only minor differences, such as stylisation changes, with the band's final band name.

The bands listed here must be notable, can be from any genre of music, and includes vocal groups whose members do not play instruments.

List
This is a sortable list, ordered alphabetically, starting with the name that the band is best known as, followed by the band's original name, and any other names they previously used (in chronological order).

See also 
 List of band name etymologies

References 

Lists of bands